"Love Don't Hate It" is a song by Dutch singer-songwriter Duncan Laurence. It was released as a digital download on 23 October 2019 by Spark Records as the second single from his debut studio album Small Town Boy, the song also features on his debut EP Worlds on Fire. It is the follow-up to "Arcade", Laurence's winning entry at the Eurovision Song Contest 2019.

Background
Laurence previously stated that he did not want to rush out a follow-up to "Arcade", but rather take his time and wait until he found the right song. De Telegraaf announced on 14 October that fans that had attended Laurence's performance in Nijmegen were told the follow-up single would be "Love Don't Hate It". Laurence called it "a song about fighting for who you are and who you choose to love" and his "answer against the hate in the world, that will always keep trying to break down what we crave most: love".

Live performance
Duncan premiered the song on Dutch television during De Wereld Draait Door on 23 October.

Personnel
Credits adapted from Tidal.
 Tofer Brown – Producer, associated performer, background vocalist, engineer, guitar, piano, programmer, studio personnel
 Duncan de Moor – Composer, lyricist, associated performer, vocals
 Michelle Buzz – Composer, lyricist
 Robert Gerongco – Composer, lyricist
 Sam Farrar – Composer, lyricist, associated performer, guitar, programmer
 Samuel Gerongco – Composer, lyricist
 Ilse DeLange – Associated performer, background vocalist
 Tijmen Zinkhaan – Engineer, studio personnel
 Frank Arkwright – Mastering engineer, studio personnel
 Cenzo Townshend – Mixer, studio personnel
 Andy Selby – Studio personnel, vocal editing

Charts

Weekly charts

Year-end charts

Certifications

References

2019 singles
2019 songs
Duncan Laurence songs
Songs written by Sam Farrar
Songs written by Duncan Laurence